Lakkavaram is a village in Talluru Mandal in the Prakasham district in the state of Andhra Pradesh, India.

Notable people

Politician Karredula Kamala Kumari was born in Lakkavaram.

References

Sources
 Lakkavarm Blog

External links
 Incomplete Site

Villages in East Godavari district